Race traitor is a pejorative reference to a person who is perceived as supporting attitudes or positions thought to be against the supposed interests or well-being of that person's own race.

See also

 Anti-Germans (political current)
 Anti-Japaneseism
 Banana
 Boba liberal
 Black-on-black racism
 Chinilpa
 Class traitor

 Coconut
 Cuckservative
 Hanjian
 Malinchista
 Rassenschande 
 Sarong party girl

 Self-hating Jew
 Shoneenism
 Uncle Tom
 West Brit
 White nigger
 Wigger

References

Pejorative terms for people
Racism